Utricularia minor, the lesser bladderwort, is a small, perennial carnivorous plant that belongs to the genus Utricularia. It is usually found affixed to the substrate but it can also survive suspended in a body of water. U. minor is a circumboreal species and is found in North America, Asia, and Europe.

See also 
 List of Utricularia species

References

External links
 http://www.fs.fed.us/r2/projects/scp/assessments/utriculariaminor.pdf

Carnivorous plants of Asia
Carnivorous plants of Europe
Carnivorous plants of North America
minor
Plants described in 1753
Taxa named by Carl Linnaeus